Vesela Pasheva (born 30 November 1946) is a Bulgarian gymnast. She competed in six events at the 1968 Summer Olympics.

References

External links
 

1946 births
Living people
Bulgarian female artistic gymnasts
Olympic gymnasts of Bulgaria
Gymnasts at the 1968 Summer Olympics
Sportspeople from Ruse, Bulgaria